Nālukettu  is the traditional homestead of old Tharavadu where many generations of a matrilineal family lived. These types of buildings are typically found in the Indian state of Kerala. The traditional architecture is typically a rectangular structure where four halls are joined together with a central courtyard open to the sky. The four halls on the sides are named Vadakkini (northern block), Padinjattini (western block), Kizhakkini (eastern block) and Thekkini (southern block). The architecture was especially catered to large families of the traditional tharavadu, to live under one roof and enjoy the commonly owned facilities of the marumakkathayam homestead.

Thachu Sastra, or the Science of Carpentry and Traditional Vasthu, was the governing science in this architectural form. This branch of knowledge was well developed in the traditional architecture of Kerala and has created its own branch of literature known under the names of Tantrasamuchaya, Vastuvidya, Manushyalaya-Chandrika, and Silparatna.

The layout of these homes is simple, and catered to the dwelling of the large number of people usually part of a tharavaadu. Ettukettu (eight halled with two central courtyards) or Pathinarukettu (sixteen halled with four central courtyards) are the more elaborate forms of the same architecture. Every structure faces the sunlight, and in some well designed naalukettu, there is excellent ventilation. Temperatures, even in the heat of summer, are markedly lower within the naalukettu.

The nalukettu and ettukettu buildings must have been inspired from the ancient Chinese house architecture. Kerala had a long and strong history of trade between Australia China.

References

External links 

 Naalukettu: A Magnificent Tradition of Domestic Architecture
 Naalukettu: A Visual Representation Of The Architecture
 Kerala Nalukettu house plans
 House Architecture
Route – Trade History between China and Kerala, India: Kerala History

House types
Houses in India
Arts of Kerala